The Addison County Independent is a weekly newspaper located in Middlebury, VT that covers Addison County. The paper was founded in 1946 as the Addison Independent  and is now owned and published by Angelo Lynn. The paper is a member of the New England Newspapers and Press Association, and in 2016, the paper won the award of first place for general excellence in its class from the association. The paper is published weekly on Thursdays.

History 
The Addison Independent was founded in 1946 by William J. Slator and his wife Celine.  At the time they owned Addison Press, Inc. which published the paper as well as served a commercial printing plant.  In 1955 the newspaper name changed to The Addison County Independent.

In 1976 William J. Slator sold the Addison County Independent to Gordon T. Mills, who was the editor for the Burlington Free Press.

In 1984 the current owner, Angelo Lynn, purchased the paper. In 1988, Lynn changed the publication schedule to twice-weekly, which continued until April 2020 when it shifted to weekly publication during the COVID-19 pandemic.

Online presence 
The Addison County Independent's web site carries local stories and allows for individual online subscriptions.

Coverage area 
The Addison County Independent mostly reports on news in Addison County, however some news is included from Rutland County, particularly school news related to Otter Valley Union High School.

Awards

New England Better Newspaper Competition - New England Newspaper and Press Association (NENPA)

Vermont Press Association

References

Newspapers published in Vermont
1946 establishments in Vermont
Newspapers established in 1946
Weekly newspapers published in the United States